Nemapogon falstriella is a species of moth belonging to the family Tineidae.

It is native to Europe.

References

Nemapogoninae
Moths described in 1881